Liu Ailing (born 2 June 1967) is a Chinese former footballer who played for the China national team at the 1991, 1995 and 1999 editions of the FIFA Women's World Cup. She won a silver medal at the 1996 Atlanta Olympics and participated at the 2000 Sydney Olympics. A playmaking midfielder, she played professional club football in Japan and the United States.

Club career

Born in Baotou, Inner Mongolia, Liu excelled in basketball and athletics but did not play football until she was 17 years old. Her parents were initially reluctant to let her play what they saw as a masculine sport.

In 1994 Liu joined Japanese second tier club Tasaki Perule FC. She helped win promotion in her first season and remained with the club until 1997.

At the 2000 WUSA Draft, Liu was selected by Philadelphia Charge in the first round, second overall behind compatriot Sun Wen. In the United States Liu experienced a culture shock; she bought only raw fruit and vegetables from the supermarket as in China she had been in regimented training camps for so long that she never learned to cook. In the 2001 WUSA season 34-year-old veteran Liu was a success, leading the team on goals (10) and points (22). She was the first woman to win WUSA's Player of the Week in two consecutive weeks, and the first woman to win it three times. Charge coach Mark Krikorian said of Liu: "She has been one of the greatest center midfielders in the world". In 2002 Liu was less effective, contributing two goals and two assists for six points in her 20 regular season appearances (11 starts). She retired at the end of the season.

International career

At the 1991 FIFA Women's World Cup, Liu played the full 80 minutes in all four of China's games. The hosts reached the quarter-finals before losing 1–0 to Sweden. In the first ever FIFA Women's World Cup match, Liu scored twice in China's 4–0 win over eventual finalists Norway on 16 November 1991.

In 1996 she won the silver medal with the Chinese team. She played all five matches and scored one goal.

At the 1997 AFC Women's Championship Liu scored four goals in China's 10–0 semi-final win over Taiwan and two goals in the 2–0 final win over obdurate North Korea. She was named tournament MVP. Liu was named in the 16-player All-Star team at the 1999 FIFA Women's World Cup. She scored the winning goal in the 2–1 first round win over Sweden and two more in the 5–0 semi-final rout of defending champions Norway, securing China's place in the final, where they lost a controversial penalty shootout to the United States.

In 2000, she was a member of the Chinese team which finished fifth in the Olympic women's tournament. She played all three matches.

In 2003 Liu took a role as deputy secretary general of the Beijing Football Association. Following the playing retirement of Liu and influential contemporaries like Sun Wen and Zhao Lihong, the Chinese national team went into sharp decline, culminating in an 8–0 defeat by Germany at the 2004 Athens Olympics. In June 2007 Liu was running the only girls' football school in Beijing, when it closed through lack of interest.

International goals

Honors

International
China
World Cup Silver Medal: 1999
Olympic Silver Medal: 1996
AFC Women's Championship: 1989, 1991, 1993, 1995, 1997, 1999
Football at the Asian Games: 1990, 1994, 1998

Individual
Asian Player of the Month: December 1997

References

External links

 
 Profile at WUSA

1967 births
Living people
Chinese women's footballers
Chinese expatriate footballers
China women's international footballers
Footballers at the 1996 Summer Olympics
Footballers at the 2000 Summer Olympics
Olympic footballers of China
Olympic silver medalists for China
Medalists at the 1996 Summer Olympics
People from Baotou
Olympic medalists in football
1991 FIFA Women's World Cup players
1995 FIFA Women's World Cup players
1999 FIFA Women's World Cup players
Footballers from Inner Mongolia
Asian Games medalists in football
Footballers at the 1990 Asian Games
Footballers at the 1994 Asian Games
Footballers at the 1998 Asian Games
Nadeshiko League players
Expatriate women's footballers in Japan
Women's United Soccer Association players
Philadelphia Charge players
Women's association football midfielders
Expatriate women's soccer players in the United States
Chinese expatriate sportspeople in the United States
Chinese expatriate sportspeople in Japan
Tasaki Perule FC players
Beijing BG Phoenix F.C. players
Asian Games gold medalists for China
Medalists at the 1990 Asian Games
Medalists at the 1994 Asian Games
Medalists at the 1998 Asian Games
FIFA Century Club